Christina Gray  (born November 1, 1978) is a Canadian politician. She is a Member of the Legislative Assembly of Alberta. First elected in 2015, in 2019 Gray was re-elected as the member representing Edmonton-Mill Woods.

She is the Official Opposition's Critic for the Ministry of Labour and Immigration. Gray also serves on the Legislative Assembly's Standing Committee on Legislative Offices and on the Standing Committee on Alberta's Economic Future.

In  the 29th Alberta Legislature Gray served as Chair of the Select Special Ethics and Accountability Committee and Deputy Chair of the Standing Committee on Public Accounts.

Political career

Minister of Labour and Minister Responsible for Democratic Renewal 
On February 2, 2016 MLA Gray was appointed to be Minister of Labour and Minister Responsible for Democratic Renewal in Premier Notley's Cabinet.

Official Opposition 
Gray serves as the Official Opposition Critic for Labour and as the Alberta NDP House Leader. She currently serves as a member of the Standing Committee on the Alberta Heritage Savings Trust Fund.

Electoral history

2019 general election

2015 general election

2008 general election

References

Alberta New Democratic Party MLAs
Living people
Politicians from Edmonton
Women MLAs in Alberta
21st-century Canadian politicians
21st-century Canadian women politicians
Members of the Executive Council of Alberta
Women government ministers of Canada
1978 births